Dondria vs. Phatfffat is the debut studio album of American R&B singer Dondria, released on August 17, 2010, by So So Def Recordings.

Singles

The first single was "You're the One", released on November 24, 2009. It peaked at number 14 on the U.S. Billboard Hot R&B/Hip-Hop Songs.
 
The second single, "Shawty Wus Up" was released May 18, 2010 and peaked at 66 on the Billboard Hot R&B/Hip-Hop Songs.

The third single, "Where Did We Go Wrong" was released June 29, 2010 and peaked at 72 on the Billboard Hot R&B/Hip-Hop Songs.

Critical reception 
Allmusic's David Jeffries gave the album three-and-a-half out of five stars and called it a "pleasing throwback" to late-1990s R&B, stating "Dondria is vocally a dead ringer for Beyoncé but her material recalls the late ‘90s, 'one-namers' like Brandy, Monifah, and Monica". Despite writing that the album "lacks progression on the production side", Shirea L. Carroll of Essence complimented Dondria's vocals and R&B sound, while noting "few misses" lyrically. Mark Edward Nero of About.com gave the album three out of five stars and viewed its lyrics as "bland", but commended Dondria's performance on "ballads and faster-paced tracks" and commented that "despite its problems, the album is a nice showcasing of a raw, but talented newcomer".

Track listing 
 "You're the One" - 2:52
 "Saving Myself" - 2:38
 "Shawty Wus Up" (featuring Johntá Austin & Diamond) - 4:01
 "Making Love" - 3:17
 "Can You Help Me" - 4:12
 "Where Did We Go Wrong" - 4:01
 "No More" - 3:43
 "Still Be With Me" - 4:10
 "You're the One (JD's Jeep Mix)" - 3:13
 "Believer" - 3:34
 "Kissed By The Sun" - 2:56

Personnel 
Credits for Dondria vs. Phatfffat adapted from Allmusic.

 Johnta Austin – Composer  
 Steven Barlow – Engineer, Assistant  
 Saisha Beechum – Make-Up  
 Derek Blanks – Art Direction, Design, Photography  
 Marcus John Bryant – Composer  
 Jimmie Cameron – Composer  
 Vella Maria Cameron – Composer  
 Brittany Carpentero – Composer  
 George Clinton – Composer  
 Bryan-Michael Cox – Composer, Producer  
 Cristyle – Vocal Arrangement  
 Dondria – Composer  
 Jermaine Dupri – Composer, Producer, Executive Producer, Mixing, Remix Producer  
 Leigh Elliott – Composer  
 Karen Freer – Cello  
 Wes Funderburk – Trombone  
 The Funderhorns – Horn  
 Kenneth Gamble – Composer  
 Joe Gransden – Trumpet  
 John Horesco – IV Engineer  
 Eddie Horst – String Arrangements  
 Josh Houghkirk – Assistant  
 Kegan Houston – Assistant  
 Leon Huff – Composer  
 Curtis Jackson – Composer  
 LaMarquis Jefferson – Bass  

 Joe the Butcher – Mixing  
 Crystal Johnson – Composer  
 Justin Bruns – Violin  
 Kenn Wagner – Violin  
 Ced Keyz – Producer  
 Daniel Laufer – Cello  
 Damien Lewis – Assistant  
 Lee Major – Producer  
 Connie McKendrick – Composer  
 Dania Miller – Hair Stylist  
 Johnny Mollings – Composer  
 Lenny Mollins – Composer  
 Tyler Nicolo – Mixing  
 Carlos Oyanedel – Assistant  
 Herb Powers – Mastering  
 William Pu – Violin  
 Christopher Pulgram – Violin  
 April Roomet – Stylist  
 William Scruggs – Saxophone  
 Sheela Iyengar – Violin  
 Olga Shpitko – Violin  
 Nakisha Smith – Composer  
 Brian Stanley – Mixing  
 Sou-Chun Su – Violin  
 Phil Tan – Mixing  
 Cedric Williams – Composer

References

External links 
 Dondria on Myspace

2010 debut albums
So So Def Recordings albums
Albums produced by Jermaine Dupri
Albums produced by Bryan-Michael Cox
Albums produced by the Inkredibles